The Harlem Fire Watchtower, also known as the Mount Morris Fire Watchtower, is the only surviving one of eleven cast-iron watchtowers placed throughout New York City starting in the 1850s. It is located in Marcus Garvey Park in Harlem, Manhattan.

The Mount Morris Park tower went into service in 1857 in response to Harlem residents’ demand. The towers gave volunteers a perch from which to watch for fires that were common in the wooden structures that then made up much of New York City, and the watchers then spread the word via bell ringing. Later, electric telegraphs were installed but the bell provided local alarms.  When pull boxes and other technological advances rendered the fire watchtowers obsolete, the system was discontinued and the other towers eventually were destroyed.  Harlem's, protected in the middle of a park, endured.

During the New Deal, the area surrounding the watchtower was rebuilt by government employees as part of the Works Project Administration jobs program. This project created a gracious plaza (sometimes called "the Acropolis"), stone retaining wall, and wide steps approaching the summit from several sides for pedestrians. The tower was designated a city landmark in 1967 and was listed on the National Register of Historic Places in 1976. The last work on the watchtower came in 1994, but cracks in the overall structure and in the bell remained. The granite parapet along the top was in need of restoration.

Weather, lack of maintenance, and neglect took their toll over the years.  Roof damage allowed water into the structure, rusting structural members. The original copper roof deteriorated and fell off, exposing the interior to more damage. Many of the internal steps were missing and park visitors may no longer climb them or get near the structure, which is protected by a fence. In 2013, the Mount Morris Park Community Improvement Association and the Marcus Garvey Park Alliance partnered with the New York City Department of Parks and Recreation to raise $4 million to restore the Harlem Watchtower, led by Valerie Jo Bradley. Starting in late 2014, NYC Parks disassembled the tower to restore the structure and ensure its soundness and stability before reconstruction. The tower reopened to visitors in December 2019.

References

External links
 
Official Site (New York City Department of Parks & Recreation)

Firewatchtower.com - An online resource for the conservation of Mount Morris Fire Watchtower in Harlem's Marcus Garvey Park, New York, NY

Fire lookout towers on the National Register of Historic Places in New York (state)
Government buildings on the National Register of Historic Places in Manhattan
Government buildings completed in 1857
Historic American Engineering Record in New York City
New York City Designated Landmarks in Manhattan
Towers completed in 1857
Harlem
1857 establishments in New York (state)